Velicham Vitharunna Penkutty is a 1982 Indian Malayalam-language film, directed by Durai and produced by P. K. Kaimal. The film stars Shankar, Poornima Jayaram, Swapna and Raveendran. The film has musical score by Shyam. The film also had a Tamil version as Punitha Malar.

Plot
Velicham Vitharunna Penkutty is an emotional love story.

Cast
Shankar as Prasad
Poornima Jayaram as Geetha
Swapna as Asha
Raveendran as Jayan 
Sukumari as Parvathy
Sankaradi as Sanku
Vanitha Krishnachandran as Vanitha
Nithya Ravindran as Nithya 
Sadhana as Pankajam
Vanchiyoor Radha as villager
Manavalan Joseph as Appu
Kamala Kamesh as Geetha's mother
Y. G. Mahendran as Swami
P. R. Menon as Jyotsyar

Soundtrack
The music was composed by Shyam and the lyrics were written by Mankombu Gopalakrishnan.

References

External links
 

1982 films
1980s Malayalam-language films
Films directed by Durai